You're a Lucky Fellow, Mr Smith is a 1943 American musical film directed by Felix E. Feist and starring Allan Jones, Evelyn Ankers and Billie Burke.

Plot
A woman marries a man to fulfill the conditions of a will.

Cast
Allan Jones as Tony Smith
Evelyn Ankers as Lynn Crandall Smith
Billie Burke as Aunt Harriet
David Bruce as Harvey Jones
Patsy O'Connor as Peggy Crandall
Stanley Clements as Squirt
Luis Alberni as Goreni
Francis Pierlot as Doc Webster
Harry Hayden as Judge
Mantan Moreland as Porter
Emory Parnell as Conductor
The King's Men

External links
You're a Lucky Fellow Mr Smith at TCMDB
You're a Lucky Fellow, Mr Smith at IMDb

1943 films
1943 musical films
American musical films
American black-and-white films
Films directed by Felix E. Feist
1940s American films